Koloti is a town in Capricorn District Municipality in the Limpopo province of South Africa. It is the seat of the 
Aganang Local Municipality. Koloti is also the home of Moletsi fm (Community radio station) and the home to Koena Segodi, professionally known by DJ Bluetooth.

References

2. Moletsi fm Main website

3. DJ Bluetooth Interview with simfonikaislands

Populated places in the Polokwane Local Municipality